Sharrif Kalil Floyd (born May 28, 1991) is a former American football defensive tackle and coach who is the assistant defensive line coach and defensive quality control coach for the Dallas Cowboys of the National Football League (NFL). He played college football for the University of Florida, where he was recognized as an All-American in 2012. Floyd was drafted by the Minnesota Vikings in the first round of the 2013 NFL Draft.

Early years
Floyd was born in Philadelphia, Pennsylvania. He attended George Washington High School in Philadelphia, where he started varsity football for 3 of his 4 years at Washington, under head coach Ron Cohen. He totaled over 60 tackles, 6 sacks and I 43 tackles for losses during his junior season while tearing his ACL during a semifinal playoff game. He received an invitation to the annual U.S. Army National Combine in January 2009, but initially could not afford the travel costs to San Antonio, Texas. With help from special-education students and counselor, Dawn Seeger, Floyd baked brownies and sold them at school for weeks to raise the money. He was able to make the trip and earned first-team all-combine honors.Becoming the #1 ranked offensive lineman of his class.  After his senior season at Washington High School, he was named a high school All-American by USA Today, Parade magazine, and EA Sports. He ended his high school career at the 2010 U.S. Army All-American Bowl.

College recruiting
Regarded as a five-star recruit by Rivals.com, Floyd was listed as the No. 1 defensive tackle prospect in the class of 2010. He chose Florida over eight other major Division I FBS college football programs, including Miami, Ohio State and USC.

College career

Floyd accepted an athletic scholarship to attend the University of Florida, where he played for coach Urban Meyer and coach Will Muschamp's Florida Gators football teams from 2010 to 2012. Arriving in Gainesville as the highest-rated football recruit since wide receiver Percy Harvin in 2006, Floyd was one of seven true freshmen to make a start for the Florida Gators in 2010. After three seasons for the Gators, Floyd totalled 115 tackles (26 of them for loss), 9.5 sacks, one forced fumble, one pass defended and blocked three field goals.

Freshman season (2010)

As a freshman in 2010, Floyd earned a starting spot and contributed with two tackles, including one for loss, in the Gators' win over Penn State in the 2011 Outback Bowl. For the season, he had 23 tackles (13 assisted and 10 solo) with 6.5 of them for loss.

Sophomore season (2011)

As a sophomore in 2011, Floyd started the final 11 games of the season at defensive end, and totaled 46 tackles, including 6.5 tackles for a loss, 1.5 quarterback sacks, a pass breakup and a blocked kick. He also tied for the team lead with four quarterback hurries. He registered his first career sack in the 2012 Gator Bowl against Ohio State, and followed it with an assisted sack on the very next play for a total loss of five yards.

Junior season (2012)

During his 2012 junior season, Floyd moved back to his natural defensive tackle position, and had 31 tackles (including 19 solo). He also had a team-high 8.5 tackles for a loss, and was second with four quarterback hurries. After the season, he was recognized as first-team All-American by The Sporting News and received third-team honors from the Associated Press. He was also a first-team All-Southeastern Conference selection.

After Florida's loss in the 2013 Sugar Bowl, Floyd announced his decision to forgo his final year of college eligibility and enter the NFL Draft.

Professional career
As of late January 2013, Floyd was projected to be a late-first round selection, and the fourth defensive tackle off the board, according to Sports Illustrated. After the combine, SI moved Floyd up to the No. 3 selection overall, and No. 1 among defensive tackles. In early April, CBSSports.com's Pete Prisco projected Floyd to go second overall, calling him "the best player in this draft". Floyd was listed as a defensive tackle, but was considered to be best fit as a defensive end in a 3–4 defensive alignment.

Floyd was chosen by the Minnesota Vikings in the first round (23rd overall pick) of the 2013 NFL Draft, becoming the first defensive tackle selected by the Vikings in the 1st round since 2003 when the team drafted Kevin Williams 9th overall. He was also the first of three players drafted by the Vikings in the first round, marking only the second time in team history the team had three picks in the first round and the first time for an NFL team since the Rams in 2001. He signed a four-year, $8,076,200 contract with the Vikings, including a $4,253,600 signing bonus, $6,569,900 guaranteed, and an average annual salary of $2,019,050. On September 29, Floyd recorded the first sack of his career when he and Jared Allen combined to sack Pittsburgh's Ben Roethlisberger during the NFL International Series in London. He ended his rookie season with 19 combined tackles, 2.5 sacks, one forced fumble, and two pass deflections.

He switched his jersey to #73 for the 2014 season, going back to his high school and college number after wearing #95 for his rookie season. In 2014, Floyd finished the season with the most quarterback hurries among Vikings defensive tackles with 20, per Pro Football Focus, despite playing just 587 snaps. He recorded 42 total tackles, 4.5 sacks and one pass deflection.

Floyd was a starting defensive tackle next to Linval Joseph in the 2015 season. Floyd recorded a half a sack in Week 3 against the San Diego Chargers, and half a sack in Week 6 against the Kansas City Chiefs. He did not play in Week 7 against the Detroit Lions due to a knee/ankle injury. He was still hampered by the injury and was listed inactive for the Week 8 match-up against the Chicago Bears.

On May 2, 2016, the Vikings announced that they picked up the fifth-year option of Floyd's contract. Floyd only played in the first game of the season before being inactive for the next 12 games dealing with a knee injury. He was placed on injured reserve on December 12, 2016.

On March 30, 2017, it was revealed that Floyd was diagnosed with nerve damage in his knee following meniscus surgery in September 2016. With the lingering nerve damage, some projected that it could be career threatening. He was placed on the reserve/non-football injury list on September 2, 2017.

Career statistics

College

NFL

See also

 2012 College Football All-America Team
 List of Florida Gators football All-Americans
 List of Florida Gators in the NFL Draft
 List of Minnesota Vikings first-round draft picks

References

External links
  Sharrif Floyd – Florida Gators athlete profile

1991 births
Living people
Players of American football from Philadelphia
American football defensive tackles
Florida Gators football players
Minnesota Vikings players